This is a list of the characters from the 1987 animated television series Beverly Hills Teens.

Characters
Bianca Dupree - A scheming, raven-haired beauty who believes she comes first above all things. This arrogant diva can often be seen riding around in her long pink limo, with her dog Empress and her chauffeur Wilshire Brentwood. She dislikes nature in favor of the clean house and conditioned air, although in 	"Camp Camping", she was excited about a camping trip - if for no other reason than the shopping required. She is very jealous of Larke Tanner's relationship with Troy Jeffries and is constantly scheming to ruin it, since Bianca is in love with him as well. Bianca is not above sabotaging her other peers, either. In "Who Wears the Pants?", she once tried to ruin Tara's entry into a beauty pageant. She is not completely without conscience however, when, in "Downhill Racer", she learned her latest scheme might lead to Larke's death, she risked her own life to rescue her, and later withdrew from the competition. Wilshire is desperately in love with Bianca, but she steps all over him, despite the gang's efforts to match them up. Oddly, while Bianca sees nothing wrong with her own habit of mistreating Wilshire, in "The Kindest Cut of All", she does not allow anybody else to do the same. Voiced by Tracey Moore and Terri Hawkes (in some episodes).
Blaze Summers - A dark blonde cowgirl who could pass for Larke Tanner's sister, both in looks and in personality. Blaze is folksy, laid-back and friendly to everyone - even Pierce Thorndyke III. She has a horse names Stardust. Ultimately, in "Visit from a Prince", her charming nature attracts the attentions of a prince, with whom she falls in love. Voiced by Tracey Moore and Terri Hawkes (in some episodes).
Buck Huckster - As his name implies, he is a slick shyster always looking to make a fast buck. Ultimately, in "Miracle at the Teen Club - Part 2", Buck's obsession with money and wealth is derailed by a nightmare which shows him what his future will be like if he does not change. Voiced by Michael Beattie.
Chester McTech - A prodigy's prodigy, Chester has skipped several grades to become a 10-year-old freshman and honor student at Beverly Hills High School. He's got his own science lab at home, complete with a dress-designing machine. He can, and does, assist many upperclassmen with their various dilemmas; nobody is ever more grateful for his help than Larke Tanner. Because of Chester's great intelligence and ingenuity, he is often pressed into service by Pierce Thorndyke III or Bianca Dupree to further their own (typically separate) agendas. Nothing makes Chester's day like a big hug and kiss from Larke, which is often his reward for getting her out of a jam. Ultimately, In "Jillian's Lesson", he ultimately falls in love with Jillian Thorndyke, in part because he's far too young to date Larke Tanner and Bianca Dupree. Voiced by Sean Roberge.
Empress - Bianca Dupree's small pink poodle, whose nasty bark is comparable to Bianca's attitude. She often helps Bianca make Larke Tanner's life harder, such as destroying the floppy discs containing Larke's homework in "The Dog Ate My Homework". Empress's archenemy is none other than Larke's cat, Tiara. Empress also hates Wilshire Brentwood. In "The Perfect Gift", Empress hates water so much Bianca dry cleans her.
Fifi (full name unknown) - This hair-salon owner is the most sought-after stylist in Beverly Hills. Voiced by Linda Sorenson.
Thomas "Gig" Josephson - A brown-haired male rocker who plays alongside Jett. He is outspoken, with a distinct British/Aussie accent. A real ladies' man, in "Double Your Trouble", Gig once dated both Larke Tanner and Tara Belle at the same time, until Jett revealed his secret. He and Jett have agreed not to date each other, despite this, Gig has feelings for her. He often becomes jealous if she expresses interest in someone else or vice versa. Voiced by Mark Saunders.
Jett Lyman - A blonde female rocker with extremely big hair and an exaggerated Valley girl accent. She disapproves of Gig's womanizing, despite being a flirt in her own right; it turns out she herself is smitten with him. Ultimately, in "Troy Triathlon" (the series' next-to-last episode), both she and Gig earn a recording contract from Vic Vinyl of Starstruck Music. Voiced by Karen Bernstein.
Jillian Thorndyke - Pierce's annoying younger sister, who tries to be much more adult than she is. Jillian, like most of the gang, isn't nearly as impressed with her brother as he is with himself. In "Jillian's Lesson", she ultimately falls in love with Chester McTech, in part because she's far too young to date Troy Jeffries. Voiced by Tracey Moore and Terri Hawkes (in some episodes).
Larke Tanner - The blonde-haired, blue-eyed teen queen of Beverly Hills. She is (mutually) head-over-heels in love with resident jock Troy Jeffries. She drives a bright pink Ferrari, usually accompanied by her pet cat Tiara. A part-time model, Larke wins many of the contests that she enters, although Bianca Dupree tries hard to sabotage her. A straight-A student. Kind-hearted and sweet to the core, Larke is basically the anti-Bianca; she's also a proud surrogate sister to Chester McTech, who has bailed her out of numerous fixes. Voiced by Mary Long.
Nikki Darling - An aspiring model/actress with a very dramatic demeanor, especially against unfairness (perceived and otherwise) in the fashion/entertainment world. In "Scene Stealer", she attempted to literally steal the spotlight for the television program "Lifestyles of the Young and Disgustingly Rich", much to the annoyance of Frank Floppalla, only to show her fury when she doesn't like being upstaged herself. Voiced by Corrine Koslo.
Pierce Thorndyke III - Pierce is egotistical, girl-crazy, snobbish and blissfully unaware that he is not the Casanova which he believes himself to be. He often teams up with Bianca Dupree in her ultimately-unsuccessful schemes to come between Larke Tanner and Troy Jeffries, because, while Bianca wants Troy, Pierce wants Larke - although he also woos Jett Lyman on occasion. Despite the aforementioned personality issues, Pierce does have his endearing moments. He carries around a wisecracking pocket-computer named C.A.D. (that is, Computer Assistant Datemaker) which holds all of his most embarrassing secrets. He is the elder brother of Jillian. Voiced by Stephen McMulkin.
Radley Coleman - A surfer dude who is fluent in the lingo, and who has raised tanning to an art-form. Anywhere a wave can be had, Radley is there. His credo: "To surf is to live. To quit is to die". In "Radley Wipes Out", he was seen to have studying problems due to this single-mindedness. He is close friends with Troy Jeffries and Gig. Voiced by Hadley Kay.
Shanelle Spencer - Intelligent and level-headed, with a wry sense of humor, she is the voice of reason among her peers. She is also president of the local country club for teenagers. A natural born leader, she sticks to the rules and never misuses her prestige. Voiced by Michelle St. John.
Brenda "Switchboard" Andes - The self-dubbed "Guru of Gossip". There's nothing Switchboard won't do, and very little she hasn't done, to find the latest "dirt" and dish it out at the teen country club. However, in "Nothing But The Gossip", she is very reluctant to spread "false" gossip. Voiced by Joanna Schellenberg.
Tara Belle - She possesses a pronounced Deep Southern accent (at least once, she referred to "folks back home on the bayou") and sports a more demure look than most of her peers, showcasing pearls, ruffles and the like. Polite and ladylike to a fault, Tara's demeanor sometimes is mistaken for naivete. Voiced by Karen Bernstein.
Tiara - Larke Tanner’s fluffy Persian cat. Like her owner, Tiara is playful and well-mannered. However, she is easily intimidated by Empress.
Troy Jeffries - A jock's jock, Troy is the most popular boy in Beverly Hills, for all the right reasons. He is adored by every girl at Beverly Hills High School - particularly his female counterpart Larke Tanner, with whom he often seems to be in an official relationship (although, according to him, they are "not going steady"). Troy is also the apple of Bianca Dupree's eye, but he (understandably) takes her in stride. Voiced by Jonathan Potts.
Wilshire Brentwood - Bianca Dupree's chauffeur and doormat. He is deeply in love with her, but she ignores him until he gets into danger, after which Bianca kisses him. His favorite color is white. Wilshire is always kind to Bianca's peers; he is the only member of the gang who (genuinely) likes Bianca despite her scheming, "me-first" attitude. In "My Fair Wilshire", she temporarily "made herself over" to become considerate - taking after her nemesis Larke Tanner - but Wilshire didn't like the "new" Bianca. In 	"Camp Camping", he insisted on serving Pierce (due to him saving Wilshire's life) instead of Bianca, with disastrous results. Voiced by Michael Beattie.

References

Lists of characters in American television animation